Muzzi is an Italian surname. Notable people with the surname include:

Antonio Muzzi (1815–1894), Italian painter
Domenico Muzzi (1742–1812), Italian painter
Oreste Muzzi (1887–1946), Italian swimmer
Roberto Muzzi (born 1971), Italian footballer
Victor Muzzi (born 1993), Brazilian photographer

See also
Mussi

Italian-language surnames